Kempling is a surname. Notable people with the surname include:

Bill Kempling (1921–1996), Canadian politician
Chris Kempling (born 1955), Canadian educator